Webster Parish (French: Paroisse de Webster) is a parish located in the northwestern section of the U.S. state of Louisiana.
The seat of the parish is Minden.

As of the 2020 census, the Webster Parish population was 36,967. Public officials who have long sought to increase the industrial potential of the parish, expressed concern over the decline. Jim Bonsall, the president of the Webster Parish Police Jury, the parish governing body, cited the ending of the Haynesville Shale boom as the primary reason for the population losses. The parish has long depended on jobs in the petroleum and natural gas fields.

The parish is named for 19th-century American statesman Daniel Webster of Massachusetts and New Hampshire. It was created on February 27, 1871 from lands formerly belonging to Bienville, Bossier, and Claiborne parishes. The parish centennial celebration was held in May 1971. Speakers included Police jury president Leland Garland Mims and Judge Enos McClendon of the Louisiana 26th Judicial District Court, who gave a biographical sketch of Daniel Webster. Many officials and parish employees dressed in period costume of the 1870s for the event.

Webster Parish is part of the Shreveport-Bossier City, LA Metropolitan Statistical Area.

Among the first settlers in Webster Parish was Newett Drew, a native of Virginia, who about 1818 established a grist mill at the former Overton community near Minden. At this time the area was Natchitoches Parish and later Overton became the Parish Seat of Claiborne Parish in 1836 until it moved in 1848.  His son, Richard Maxwell Drew was born in Overton and served as a district judge and state representative prior to his death in 1850 at the age of twenty-eight. R. M. Drew's descendants held judicial or legislative positions in Webster Parish as well, Richard Cleveland Drew, Harmon Caldwell Drew, R. Harmon Drew, Sr., and Harmon Drew, Jr.

Geography

Major highways
  Interstate 20
  Future Interstate 69
  U.S. Highway 79
  U.S. Highway 80
  U.S. Highway 371
  Louisiana Highway 2

Adjacent counties and parishes
 Lafayette County, Arkansas  (north)
 Columbia County, Arkansas  (northeast)
 Claiborne Parish  (east)
 Bienville Parish  (southeast)
 Bossier Parish  (west)

National protected areas
 Kisatchie National Forest (part)
 Caney Lakes Recreation Area near Minden (not to be confused with another Caney Lake near Jonesboro, Louisiana)

Law, government, and politics
In 1996, the Webster Parish Police Jury approved a $1,849,000 bid to the firm Finney Co. of Shreveport for construction of a new parish library facility on Est and West Street in Minden.

Webster Parish is generally competitive in most contested elections. The parish voted for Republican Barry Goldwater for president in 1964 and George Wallace in 1968, when the former governor of Alabama ran on the American Independent Party ticket. Richard Nixon won here in 1972, and Jimmy Carter of Georgia prevailed in 1976. In 1984, U.S. President Ronald Reagan won the parish by a nearly two-to-one margin over former Vice President Walter F. Mondale.

In 2000, Governor George W. Bush of Texas won in Webster Parish with 9,420 votes (55.1 percent), compared to then Vice President Al Gore's 7,197 (42.1 percent). Patrick Buchanan of the Reform Party held 183 votes (1.1 percent). In 2004, Bush again won the parish, having polled 11,070 votes (60 percent) to Democrat John Kerry's 6,833 (37 percent).

In 2008, U.S. Senator John McCain of Arizona carried Webster Parish with 11,417 votes (62.5 percent), compared to Barack Obama's 6,610 (36.2 percent). Four years later in 2012, Republican Mitt Romney led in the parish with 11,400 votes (61.9 percent), 17 fewer ballots than McCain had received. In 2012, President Obama polled 6,802 votes (36.9 percent), 192 more than his 2008 tabulation.

The last Democrat hence to have won in Webster Parish at the presidential level was Bill Clinton in 1996, who received 9,688 (55.3 percent), compared to Republican Robert Dole's 6,153 ballots (35.1 percent). Ross Perot, founder of the Reform Party, held 1,324 votes (7.6 percent). In that same election, the Democrat Mary Landrieu carried Webster Parish in her successful U.S. Senate race against Republican Woody Jenkins, 8,459 (51.3 percent) to 8,020 (48.7 percent).

Demographics

2020 census

As of the 2020 United States census, there were 36,967 people, 16,551 households, and 10,295 families residing in the parish.

2010 census
As of the census of 2010 there were 52,903 people, 20,500 households, and 12,589 families residing in the parish. The population density was 92 people per square mile (27/km2). There were 18,991 housing units at an average density of 32 per square mile (12/km2). The racial makeup of the parish was 65.51% White, 32.83% Black or African American, 0.34% Native American, 0.19% Asian, 0.04% Pacific Islander, 0.22% from other races, and 0.86% from two or more races.  0.90% of the population were Hispanic or Latino of any race.

There were 16,501 households, of which 30.40% had children under the age of 18 living with them, 49.70% were married couples living together, 16.30% had a female householder with no husband present, and 29.90% were non-families. 27.00% of all households were made up of individuals, and 12.90% had someone living alone who was 65 years of age or older.  The average household size was 2.48 and the average family size was 2.99.

In the parish the population was spread out, with 25.60% under the age of 18, 8.60% from 18 to 24, 26.00% from 25 to 44, 23.60% from 45 to 64, and 16.30% who were 65 years of age or older. The median age was 38 years. For every 100 females there were 91.80 males.  For every 100 females age 18 and over, there were 88.20 males.

The median income for a household in the parish was $28,408, and the median income for a family was $35,119. Males had a median income of $30,343 versus $20,907 for females. The per capita income for the parish was $15,203.  About 15.30% of families and 20.20% of the population were below the poverty line, including 29.60% of those under age 18 and 16.10% of those age 65 or over.

Education
The elected Webster Parish School Board operates local public schools.

It is in the service area of Bossier Parish Community College.

National Guard
The 39th MP Company of the 773rd MP Battalion and the 1083rd Transportation Company of the 165th CSS (Combat Service Support) Battalion reside at Camp Minden west of Minden, formerly the Louisiana Army Ammunition Plant. Both of these battalions are part of the 139TH RSG (Regional Support Group).

Communities

Cities 
 Minden (parish seat and largest municipality)
 Springhill

Towns 
 Cotton Valley
 Cullen
 Sarepta
 Sibley

Villages 
 Dixie Inn
 Doyline
 Dubberly
 Heflin
 Shongaloo

Unincorporated communities 
 Midway
 Yellow Pine

Notable people
 Alan Bean, astronaut, fourth person to walk on the Moon
 "Sweet Lou" Dunbar, basketball player, 27-year player for the Harlem Globetrotters
 Gene Austin, crooner, singer of "My Blue Heaven," the best-selling American single until 1942
 Marshall H. Twitchell, Reconstruction official, victim of assassination attempt
 John Cecil Jones, World War II veteran and lynching victim
 Countess Leon, co-founder and leader of the utopian Germantown colony
 John L. Nelson, jazz musician under the name Prince Rogers, father of musician Prince
 Charlie Hennigan, AFL All-Star wide receiver
 James Burton, guitarist, member of the Rock and Roll Hall of Fame
 Roger Carr, Pro Bowl NFL wide receiver
 Percy Mayfield, R&B singer
 John David Crow, American football player, coach, and college athletics administrator
 John T. Watkins, eight-term member of the U.S. House of Representatives

See also

 National Register of Historic Places listings in Webster Parish, Louisiana

References

 
Louisiana parishes
1871 establishments in Louisiana
Populated places established in 1871